Ottmar Liebert (born 1 February 1959) is a German guitarist, songwriter and producer best known for his Spanish-influenced music. A five-time Grammy Award nominee, Liebert has received 38 Gold and Platinum certifications in the United States, as well as certifications in Canada, Australia and New Zealand. His debut album Nouveau Flamenco (1990) was certified Platinum in the United States.

Early life
Ottmar Liebert was born 1 February 1959 in Cologne, West Germany, to a Chinese-German father and a Hungarian mother. As a child, he spent most of his time travelling throughout Europe and Asia with his family. He began playing classical guitar at 11, and studying flamenco guitar at 14, after he "found a Flamenco LP in the bargain bin at a local supermarket." After performing rock music in his native Germany, he moved to the United States and settled in Boston for a few years, performing in various rock clubs. In 1986 Liebert settled in Santa Fe, New Mexico, where he began looking to create a new musical sound.

Liebert cites musical influences such as "Carlos Santana, Paco de Lucía, John McLaughlin, Robert Fripp and Jeff Beck, others were horn players like Miles Davis,"  although he cites "others yet were fine artists who taught me about space and brush strokes and dynamics and contrast."

Music career

In 1988, Liebert founded the first incarnation of his band Luna Negra (black moon). That year he recorded a self-produced album titled Marita: Shadows and Storms. The initial thousand copies were sold in the gallery of Santa Fe artist Frank Howell. When the record found its way to radio stations and began generating a response among listeners, Higher Octave Music picked it up and released a remastered version titled Nouveau Flamenco (1990). The album eventually sold double-platinum in the United States.

Liebert followed up his debut with several successful albums that continued and expanded his sound, including Borrasca (1991), Solo Para Ti (1992) and The Hours Between Night + Day (1993), all three earning Gold certification. Liebert's international success continued with ¡Viva! (1995) and Opium (1996), both of which earned Platinum status in the United States and Latin America.

Liebert has recorded with Luna Negra since 1989. Personnel in the band have changed regularly since then, with the only constant being bassist Jon Gagan.

Since 1990, Ottmar Liebert has released a total of 25 albums including live releases, Christmas CDs, 15 CDs of original music, a DVD, and various remixes. He has received 38 Gold and Platinum certifications in the US as well as certifications in Canada, Australia, and New Zealand.

In 2006, Liebert contributed his song "This Spring Release 10,000 Butterflies" to the album project Artists for Charity - Guitarists 4 the Kids, produced by Slang Productions, to assist World Vision Canada in helping underprivileged kids in need.

Nouveau Flamenco
Liebert describes his musical style as "Nouveau Flamenco." In a 2004 interview, Liebert explained that once he was signed to a record label, he was required to come up with a name for what he was doing. Although there are flamenco elements to his music, it's nothing like traditional flamenco, being based on melody and using much simpler forms. As this music couldn't be considered jazz, rock, or classical, he felt that flamenco was the closest word to use that people could identify with.

Liebert drew some criticism with his adoption of the term, especially since according to critics, none of his works to date followed traditional flamenco palo forms. It was also perceived by some as a marketing ploy and an attempt to associate his music with the then burgeoning school of "Flamenco Nuevo", where acknowledged flamenco artists had started to rejuvenate and reinvent flamenco through the introduction of influences from Latin America (e.g. the Rumba rhythm) and even jazz music. Paco de Lucia was one such critic. Despite Liebert's citing Paco as an influence, Paco described Liebert's music as "una degeneración, una caricatura del flamenco" (literally, "a degeneration, a caricature"). However, Paco later seemed to appreciate Liebert's music, with Paco's record company even mentioning him in promotional materials.

Personal life
Since 1986 Liebert has lived in Santa Fe, New Mexico. In May 2006 Liebert was ordained as a Zen monk by Dennis Genpo Merzel at the Kanzeon Zen Center in Salt Lake City, Utah.

Awards
 Nouveau Flamenco (1990) Certified: Platinum – US, 14 x Platinum – US/Latin, Platinum – Australia, Platinum – New Zealand, Gold – Canada, Gold – Mexico
 Poets & Angels: Music 4 the Holidays (1990) Certified: 2 x Platinum – US/Latin
 Borrasca (1991) Certified: Gold – US, 4 x Platinum – US/Latin
 Solo Para Ti (1992) Certified: Gold – US, 2 x Platinum – US/Latin, Gold – Canada
 The Hours Between Night + Day (1993) Certified: Gold – US, 2 x Platinum – US/Latin, Gold – Canada, Gold – New Zealand
 Euphoria (1995) Certified: Gold – US/Latin
 ¡Viva! (1995) Certified: Platinum – US/Latin
 Opium (1996) Certified: Platinum – US/Latin
 Leaning Into the Night (Inclinado en la Noche) (1997) Certified: Gold – US/Latin
 Innamorare: Summer Flamenco (1999) Certified: Gold – US/Latin
 Nouveau Flamenco: 1990–2000 Special Tenth Anniversary Edition (2000) Certified: Platinum – US/Latin

Discography

Studio albums

Compilations
 Rumba Collection 1992–1997 (1998)
 Barcelona Nights: The Best of Ottmar Liebert Volume One (2001)
 Surrender 2 Love: The Best of Ottmar Liebert Volume Two (2001)
 The Best Of Ottmar Liebert (2002)
 Spanish Sun (2009)
 Bare Wood 2002-2012 (2014)

Singles
 Havana Club 12" 45 (1995); Vinyl
 Havana Club (1997)
 Spanish Steps 12" 45 (1999); Vinyl
 Little Wing - Radio Sampler (2001)

Featured performances
 Leap of Faith by Kenny Loggins (1991)
 Lonely Chaplin by Goody's (1992)
 Edith Piaf Tribute: My Legionaire (1993)
 Monsoon by Asiabeat (1994)
 Hemispheres by Dan Siegel (1995)
 Burning Whispers by Nestor Torres (1995)
 Take Me Higher by Diana Ross (1995)
 Falling into You by Celine Dion (1996)
 Voci e Chitarre by Lavezzimogol (1997)
 Leda Battisti by Leda Battisti (1998)
 Sundance Flamenco by James Bobchak (1999)
 Azul by Alan (1999)
 Soul Encounters/Encuentros del Alma by Chuscales (1999)
 Ancient Journeys by Cusco (2000)
 Transit by Jon Gagan (2004)
 Transit 2 by Jon Gagan (2006)
 Thira by Stephen Duros (2006)
 Tu, l'amore e il sesso by Leda Battisti (2007)
 The Art of Live Looping by Matthew Schoening (2008)
 Split Decision by Roy Rogers (2009)

Produced albums
 Soul Encounters/Encuentros Del Alma by Chuscales (1999)

Videos
 Wide-eyed + Dreaming – Live (1996), VHS and DVD

Other compilation appearances
 Guitar Music For Small Rooms (1997) (WEA)
 Gypsy Passion: New Flamenco (1997) (Narada)
 Obsession: New Flamenco Romance (1999) (Narada)
 Gypsy Fire (2000) (Narada)
 Guitar Music For Small Rooms 2 (2001) (WEA)
 Gypsy Spice: Best of New Flamenco (2009) (Baja Records)
 The World Of The Spanish Guitar Vol. 1 (2011) (Higher Octave Music)

See also 
Johannes Linstead
List of ambient music artists

References

Notes

Citations

External links
 Official Ottmar Liebert and Luna Negra Site
 Bio of "Opium" Album with reference to Stefan Liebert
 Ottmar Liebert Diary
 Gold and Platinum Album Certifications (RIAA)

1959 births
Living people
German guitarists
German male guitarists
Musicians from Santa Fe, New Mexico
New flamenco
Guitarists from New Mexico
20th-century American guitarists
20th-century American male musicians
American male guitarists